In algebraic geometry, a level structure on a space X is an extra structure attached to X that shrinks or eliminates the automorphism group of X, by demanding automorphisms to preserve the level structure; attaching a level structure is often phrased as rigidifying the geometry of X.

In applications, a level structure is used in the construction of moduli spaces; a moduli space is often constructed as a quotient. The presence of automorphisms poses a difficulty to forming a quotient; thus introducing level structures helps overcome this difficulty.

There is no single definition of a level structure; rather, depending on the space X, one introduces the notion of a level structure. The classic one is that on an elliptic curve (see #Example: an abelian scheme).

Level structures on elliptic curves 
Classically, level structures on elliptic curves  are given by a lattice containing the defining lattice of the variety. Then, the lattice generated by  gives a lattice which contains all -torsion points on the elliptic curve denoted .

Example: an abelian scheme 
Let  be an abelian scheme whose geometric fibers have dimension g.

Let n be a positive integer that is prime to the residue field of each s in S. For n ≥ 2, a level n-structure is a set of sections  such that
  is the identity section, where  is the multiplication by n.

See also: modular curve#Examples, moduli stack of elliptic curves.

See also 
Siegel modular form
Rigidity (mathematics)
Local rigidity

Notes

References

Further reading
 Notes on principal bundles
 J. Lurie, Level Structures on Elliptic Curves. 

Algebraic geometry